Seltmann is a German surname. Notable people with the surname include:
 Darren Seltmann, Australian singer-songwriter, musician and producer
 Sally Seltmann (born 1975), Australian singer-songwriter, multi-instrumentalist and Record producer

German-language surnames